Materials Research Bulletin is a peer-reviewed, scientific journal that covers the study of materials science and engineering. The journal is published by Elsevier and was established in 1966. The Editor-in-Chief is Rick Ubic.

The journal focuses on the development and understanding of materials, including their properties, structure, and processing, and the application of these materials in various fields. The scope of the journal includes the following areas: ceramics, metals, polymers, composites, electronic and optical materials, and biomaterials.

Materials Research Bulletin features original research articles, review articles, and short communications.

Abstracting and indexing 
The journal is abstracted and indexed for example in:

 Materials Science Citation Index
 Chemical Abstracts

 Cambridge Scientific Abstracts
 Scopus
 Web of Science

According to the Journal Citation Reports, the journal has a 2021 impact factor of 5.6.

References

External links 

 

Materials
English-language journals
Elsevier academic journals
Materials science journals
Publications established in 1966